Amos Tom Wargo (born September 16, 1942) is an American professional golfer, best known for winning the 1993 PGA Seniors' Championship–one of the major championships on the men's Senior PGA Tour and the 1994 Senior British Open, later also recognized as a senior major championship.

Early life
Wargo was born in Marlette in the heart of "The Thumb" of Michigan, and grew up on a nearby dairy farm. He attended Mayville High School. He did not play golf until he taught himself to play at age 25. Prior to his career as a professional golfer, he had worked as an iron worker, assembly-line autoworker, bartender and fisherman in Alaska.

Professional career
Wargo turned pro in 1976. He spent most of his regular PGA career years as the head club pro at the Greenview GC that he co-owns in Centralia, Illinois. In 1992, he received the PGA Club Professional-of-the-Year award. Wargo played in only a handful of PGA Tour events. His best finish in a PGA Tour event, which was a major championship, was a T-28 at the 1992 PGA Championship.

After reaching the age of 50, Wargo joined the Senior PGA Tour in 1993. He has four victories including two senior major championships and over 100 top-10 finishes in this venue. He lives in Centralia, Illinois.

Professional wins (10)

Other wins (5)
1988 Illinois PGA Section Championship
1990 Gateway PGA Sectional Championship, Irvin Cobb Championship
1991 PGA Club Professional Winter Stroke Play Championship, Gateway PGA Sectional Championship

Senior PGA Tour wins (5)

Senior PGA Tour playoff record (2–2)

Results in major championships

Note: Wargo only played in The Open Championship and the PGA Championship.

CUT = missed the half-way cut
"T" = tied

Senior major championships

Wins (2)

1Defeated Crampton with par on second extra hole.

U.S. national team appearances
PGA Cup: 1988 (winners), 1992 (winners)

External links

American male golfers
PGA Tour Champions golfers
Winners of senior major golf championships
Golfers from Michigan
People from Sanilac County, Michigan
People from Centralia, Illinois
1942 births
Living people